Francis M. Case was an American politician.  He served as mayor of Denver, Colorado from 1873 to 1874. He is buried at Denver's Fairmount Cemetery.

References

Mayors of Denver
1835 births
1892 deaths
Burials at Fairmount Cemetery (Denver, Colorado)